The Yamaha Virago was Yamaha's first V-twin cruiser motorcycle, and one of the earliest mass-produced motorcycles with a mono-shock rear suspension. Originally sold with a  engine in 1981, Yamaha soon added  and  versions.

The bike was redesigned in 1984, switching from a rear mono-shock to a dual-shock design, and adding a tear-drop shaped gas tank.  That year, Harley-Davidson, fearful of the inroads in the US market made by the Virago and other new Japanese cruiser-style motorcycles, pushed for a tariff on imported bikes over 700 cc.  Yamaha replaced the 750 cc engine with a 699 cc version to avoid the tariff, while the 920 cc engine grew to 981 cc (XV1000), and later 1063 cc (XV1100). 

In 1988 a 250 cc Virago was added. A short production (1997-2000) of 125 cc was also manufactured. Yamaha made an XV125, XV250, XV400, XV500, XV535, XV700, XV750, XV920R, XV1000/TR1, and an XV1100, with the XV400SCLX being the rarest. XV125, XV250, XV920R and XV1000/TR1 were chain driven, other models were equipped with shaft drive. 

The larger-displacement Viragos were eventually phased out of production, replaced by the V-Star and Road Star series of motorbikes. The engines lived on, however. The facelifted version of the original XV750/1100 powerplant was used in the V-star 1100 models, the XV400/535 engine with slightly more bore and stroke was used in the V-star 650. The last motorcycle to bear the Virago name was the 2007 Virago 250.  For 2008 it was renamed the V-Star 250.

According to Motorcyclist magazine, the early Virago has a design flaw in the starter system. Being fully mechanical, under less than ideal circumstances (eg. weak battery) it promoted wear on the starter engagement/disengagement system.  This magazine states that the starter's defect exists in early Virago models made in year 1981, 1982 and 1983. XV700 models of the model years 1984 and 1985 also had the weaker, fully mechanical starter system. Improved electro-mechanical systems were applied as of 1986 on all 700, 750, 1000 and 1100 cc units.

References

Virago
Cruiser motorcycles
Motorcycles introduced in 1981
Motorcycles powered by V engines